Newcastle Jets Football Club is an Australian professional association football club based in Newcastle, New South Wales. The club was formed in 2000 as Newcastle United before being renamed as Newcastle Jets in 2005. After spending their first four seasons participating in the National Soccer League, Newcastle became the first of three New South Wales members admitted to the A-League Men along with the Central Coast Mariners and Sydney FC.

The list encompasses the honours won by the Newcastle Jets at national and friendly level, records set by the club, their managers and their players. The player records section itemises the club's leading goalscorers and those who have made most appearances in first-team competitions.

Newcastle have won one top-flight title. The club's record appearance maker is Jason Hoffman, who has currently made 218 appearances from 2008 to the present day. Joel Griffiths is Newcastle Jets' record goalscorer, scoring 61 goals in total.

All figures are correct as of the match played on 27 January 2023.

Honours and achievements

Domestic
 National Soccer League (until 2004) and A-League Men Premiership 
 Runners-up (1): 2001–02

 National Soccer League (until 2004) and A-League Men Championship
 Winners (1): 2007–08
 Runners-up (1): 2017–18

Other

Pre-season
 Surf City Cup
 Runners-up (1): 2019

Player records

Appearances
 Most league appearances: Jason Hoffman, 200
 Most Australia Cup appearances: Jason Hoffman, 8
 Youngest first-team player: Archie Goodwin, 16 years, 106 days (against Melbourne Victory, A-League, 21 February 2021)
 Oldest first-team player: Wes Hoolahan, 37 years, 308 days (against Melbourne City, A-League, 23 March 2020)
 Most consecutive appearances: Steven Ugarkovic, 113 (from 13 February 2017 — 27 March 2021)

Most appearances
Competitive matches only, includes appearances as substitute. Numbers in brackets indicate goals scored.

a. Includes the National Soccer League and A-League Men.
b. Includes the A-League Pre-Season Challenge Cup and Australia Cup
c. Includes goals and appearances (including those as a substitute) in the 2005 Australian Club World Championship Qualifying Tournament.

Goalscorers
 First goalscorer: Anthony Surjan (against Eastern Pride, National Soccer League, 14 October 2000)
 First A-League Men goalscorer: Ante Milicic (against Central Coast Mariners, 4 September 2005)
 First hat-trick scorer: Joel Griffiths (against Northern Spirit, National Soccer League, 4 October 2002)
 First A-League Men hat-trick scorer: Ante Milicic (against New Zealand Knights, A-League, 4 November 2005)
 Youngest goalscorer: Archie Goodwin, 16 years, 151 days (against Melbourne City, A-League, 10 June 2021)
 Oldest goalscorer: Wes Hoolahan, 37 years, 93 days (against Edgeworth, FFA Cup, 21 August 2019)

Top goalscorers
Competitive matches only. Numbers in brackets indicate appearances made.

a. Includes the National Soccer League and A-League Men.
b. Includes the A-League Pre-Season Challenge Cup and Australia Cup
c. Includes goals and appearances (including those as a substitute) in the 2005 Australian Club World Championship Qualifying Tournament.

International
This section refers to caps won while a Newcastle Jets player.

 First capped player: Chris Zoricich for New Zealand against Malaysia on 19 August 2000

Managerial records

 First full-time manager: Lee Sterrey managed Newcastle Jets from July 2000 to June 2001.
 Longest-serving manager: Ian Crook —  (1 July 2001 to 30 June 2004)
 Shortest tenure as manager: Phil Stubbins — 2 weeks, 6 days (5 May 2015 to 25 May 2015)

Club records

Matches

Firsts
 First match: Eastern Pride 1–1 Newcastle United, National Soccer League, 14 October 2000
 First A-League Men match: Newcastle Jets 0–1 Adelaide United, 26 August 2005
 First national cup match: Newcastle Jets 1–1 Melbourne Victory, A-League Pre-Season Challenge Cup group stage, 22 July 2005
 First Asian match: Beijing Guoan 2–0 Newcastle Jets, AFC Champions League group stage, 10 March 2009
In 2023 the club broke the record for the longest game of football it lasted 4 hours last record was in 1946 Donscaster v Stockport

Record wins
 Record league win: 8–2 against Central Coast Mariners, A-League, 14 August 2018
 Record national cup win: 5–1 against Edgeworth, Round of 16, 21 August 2019
 Record Asian win: 
 2–0 against Ulsan Hyundai, AFC Champions League group stage, 17 March 2009
 3–1 against Persija Jakarta, AFC Champions League second qualifying round, 12 January 2019

Record defeats
 Record league defeat: 0–7 against Adelaide United, A-League, 24 January 2015
 Record national cup defeat: 1–4 against Adelaide United, A-League Pre-Season Challenge Cup group stage, 27 July 2007
 Record Asian defeat: 0–6 against Pohang Steelers, AFC Champions League group stage, 20 May 2009

Record consecutive results
 Record consecutive wins: 4
 from 4 January 2008 to 27 January 2008
 from 29 November 2009 to 20 December 2009
 from 20 April 2019 to 21 August 2019
 Record consecutive defeats: 7
 from 5 March 2017 to 9 August 2017
 from 28 February 2021 to 10 April 2021
 Record consecutive matches without a defeat: 7
 from 14 October 2005 to 25 November 2005
 from 4 August 2007 to 21 September 2007
 from 13 November 2010 to 15 December 2010
 Record consecutive matches without a win: 17, from 26 January 2006 to 8 October 2006
 Record consecutive matches without conceding a goal: 3
 from 11 November 2005 to 25 November 2005
 from 6 January 2006 to 22 January 2006
 from 4 December 2010 to 15 December 2010
 from 5 January 2013 to 19 January 2013
 from 24 July 2020 to 13 August 2020
 from 7 February 2021 to 21 February 2021
 from 18 March 2022 to 30 March 2022
 Record consecutive matches without scoring a goal: 6
 from 4 December 2015 to 9 January 2016
 from 18 March 2017 to 9 August 2017

Goals
 Most league goals scored in a season: 57 in 27 matches, A-League, 2017–18
 Fewest league goals scored in a season: 18 in 24 matches, National Soccer League, 2003–04
 Most league goals conceded in a season: 56 in 30 matches, National Soccer League, 2000–01
 Fewest league goals conceded in a season: 21 in 24 matches, National Soccer League, 2001–02

Points
 Most points in a season: 50 in 27 matches, A-League, 2017–18
 Fewest points in a season: 17 in 27 matches, A-League, 2014–15

References

External links
 Official website

Newcastle Jets
Newcastle Jets FC